Moton may refer to:

People

Given name
 Moton Hopkins (born 1986), American professional gridiron football player

Surname
 LeVelle Moton (born 1974), American college basketball coach
 Robert Russa Moton (1867–1940), African American educator and author
 Taylor Moton (born 1994), American football player

Schools
 R.R. Moton High School, historic segregated school located in Prince Edward County, Virginia
 Dr. R. Moton High School, located in Brookside, Florida
 Moton High School (Oklahoma), Taft, Oklahoma

Other uses
 Moton Field, part of the Tuskegee Airmen National Historic Site
 Moton Field Municipal Airport, Airport located north of Tuskegee, Alabama
 Robert Russa Moton Museum (Moton High School), National Historic Landmark in Prince Edward County, Virginia
 Robert Russa Moton Boyhood Home, historic plantation in Prince Edward County, Virginia
 Holly Knoll, aka Robert R. Moton House, National Historic Landmark in Gloucester County, Virginia

See also
 Motown, American record label
 Morton (disambiguation)